Peter Rojas (born March 18, 1975) is the co-founder of technology blogs Gizmodo and Engadget, as well as the video gaming blog Joystiq (2004).

Education
Rojas attended Harvard University from 1993 to 1997 where he managed the school's radio station WHRB and was a disk jockey on the Record Hospital program. After graduating magna cum laude with a B.A. in Social Studies, Rojas received an M.A. in English Literature from the University of Sussex in 1998.

Career
Rojas worked at Red Herring magazine from June 1999 to May 2001, first as Associate Editor then as a writer. He was co-founder and Editorial Director of Gizmodo from July 2002 until March 2004, leaving to co-found Engadget. Two months later he also founded the video game blog Joystiq. Both were part of Weblogs Inc., a blog network that was purchased by AOL in 2005.

Along with Josh Deutsch of Downtown Records, Rojas launched the online record label RCRD LBL in 2007.

In July 2008 Rojas left Engadget to start the consumer electronics social networking site GDGT. The site premiered in 2009 and was co-founded with Ryan Block, Rojas' successor as Engadget editor-in-chief.

In February 2013 GDGT was purchased by AOL.

, he is a partner at Betaworks Ventures.

Personal life
In July 2007, Rojas married Jill Fehrenbacher, the founder of the blog Inhabitat. The couple had a son in 2008, shortly after Fehrenbacher founded a new site named Inhabitots.

References

External links

Work Inspiration with Peter Rojas - Interview on Workspiration.org

American bloggers
Harvard University alumni
Living people
Weblogs, Inc.
1975 births
American technology company founders
Alumni of the University of Sussex
American magazine writers
AOL employees
American magazine editors
21st-century American non-fiction writers